Ahn Jong-Hun (born 5 July 1989) is a South Korean former footballer who plays as a forward.

External links 

1989 births
Living people
Association football forwards
South Korean footballers
Jeju United FC players
Gwangju FC players
K League 1 players
K League 2 players
Korea National League players